Pyracantha atalantioides (common names: Gigg's firethorn and Sichuan firethorn) is a species of Firethorn shrub.

Description
Its flowers are white and they bloom from March to June. Its small berry-shaped pome fruits are red. Its branches have long spines. It is grown in gardens and parks as an ornamental plant. They are also grown as hedges. It is sometimes used in bonsai.

Distribution
The species originated from southern China but it has been introduced to North America and has been naturalised, especially in California.

References

External links
info from British Towns and Villages Network
Pyracantha atalantioides

Further reading

atalantoides
Endemic flora of China